Athletics at the 1997 Games of the Small States of Europe were held in Reykjavík, Iceland between 2 and 7 June.

Medal summary

Men

Women

Medal table

References

Games of the Small States of Europe
1997 Games of the Small States of Europe
1997
1997 Games of the Small States of Europe